Alytus Stadium is a multi-use stadium in Alytus, Lithuania. It is currently used mostly for football matches and is the home stadium of DFK Dainava Alytus. The stadium holds 3,726 people. Opened in 1924, the stadium was renovated four times: 1957–1958, 1993, 2007, and 2009–2010.

Architecture

The stadium is consisting of two opposite side-pitch stands: a 1,740 seat East stand and the main West stand, which holds 1,986 seats under a roof.

References

Football venues in Lithuania
Alytus
Buildings and structures in Alytus County